The 2012–13 Leinster Senior Cup, was the 112th staging of the Leinster Senior Cup association football competition.

39 teams entered the 2012–13 competition including the 11 Leinster based League of Ireland teams who entered the competition at the Fourth round stage. A further 15 Intermediate teams and 13 Junior teams entered the competition at the First and Second Round stage.

Shamrock Rovers are the defending champions.

Participating Teams
The teams taking part in the 2013 Leinster Senior Cup are:

First round
10 Intermediate clubs and 6 Junior clubs were entered into this round by a draw. Byes were given to 12 other clubs. Winners progress to the Second Round.

Byes:
 Edenderry Town
 Bangor Celtic
 St. Patrick's C.Y.F.C.
 Ratoath Harps
 Phoenix F.C. Navan Road
 Sheriff Y.C. 
 Duleek
 Galty Celtic
 Clontarf Athletic
 Willow Park
 Liffey Celtic
 Arklow Town B

Second round
10 Intermediate clubs and 10 Junior clubs were placed in the draw for the Second Round. The winners of these 10 matches will proceed to the Third Round.

Third round
5 Intermediate clubs and 5 Junior clubs made it to the draw for the Third Round. The 5 winners will go on to the Fourth Round.

Fourth round
The 3 Intermediate teams and the 2 Junior teams that won their Third Round matches were placed in the draw for the Fourth Round along with the 11 Leinster based Senior League of Ireland teams. The draw took place on 28 January 2013.

Quarter-finals
The draw for the quarter-finals was made on 24 April 2013 in Abbotstown, Dublin.

Semi-finals

Final

See also
2013 Leinster Senior Cup Final

References

External links
 Official website

Leinster Senior Cup (association football)
4
4